Stephen Robert "Steve" Endean (August 6, 1948 – August 4, 1993) was an American gay rights activist, first in Minnesota, then nationally.

Early life 
He was born in Davenport, Iowa, and came to Minnesota to attend the University of Minnesota from 1968 to 1972, majoring in political science.

Career 
In 1971, Endean founded the Minnesota Committee for Gay Rights (later Gay Rights Legislative Committee), and became the first gay and lesbian rights lobbyist in Minnesota a year later.

In 1973, Endean started lobbying the Minneapolis City Council to include protection for gay rights in the Minneapolis anti-discrimination ordinance working out of the office of then 6th Ward Alderman, Earl Netwal.  Endean's persistent efforts eventually lead to a 12–0 vote as Minneapolis became the first major United States city to pass a gay rights Ordinance. (The vote was scheduled on a day when the one opposed alderman was away.)

Along with the Minnesota Committee for Gay Rights and Democratic legislators, Endean opposed trans-inclusion and public accommodations in a statewide gay rights bill, giving as their reason the belief that the bill would not pass with such inclusion. In the 1970s, he served as co-chairman of the Board of Directors of the National Gay Task Force (later NGLTF). In 1978, he became the director of the Gay Rights National Lobby. In 1980, he started the Human Rights Campaign Fund (later just HRC), and served as its first executive director.

In 1991, he created the National Endorsement Campaign, an effort to get straight political leaders and media figures to endorse LGBT rights. Also in 1991, he published his memoir, Into the Mainstream. In 1993, he was present (in a wheelchair) at the Minnesota State Capitol when the Legislature passed the Minnesota Human Rights Act, which banned LGBT discrimination in housing, employment, and education.  (This law did include coverage for Trans people; the first such state inclusion in the country.)

Personal life 
In 1985, Endean was diagnosed with AIDS. After this, increasing health problems led to semi-retirement. He died of AIDS-related complications on August 4, 1993. 

He was a member of the Metropolitan Community Church.

References

American LGBT rights activists
1948 births
University of Minnesota College of Liberal Arts alumni
1993 deaths
LGBT people from Iowa
20th-century American LGBT people